Calliotropis mogadorensis is a species of sea snail, a marine gastropod mollusk in the family Eucyclidae.

Description
The height of the shell attains 13 mm.

Distribution
This species occurs in the Atlantic Ocean off Morocco at depths between 912 m and 1900 m.

References

  Locard A. (1898). Expéditions scientifiques du Travailleur et du Talisman pendant les années 1880, 1881, 1882 et 1883. Mollusques testacés. Paris, Masson.vol. 2 [1898], p. 1-515, pl. 1–18
 Gofas, S.; Le Renard, J.; Bouchet, P. (2001). Mollusca, in: Costello, M.J. et al. (Ed.) (2001). European register of marine species: a check-list of the marine species in Europe and a bibliography of guides to their identification. Collection Patrimoines Naturels, 50: pp. 180–213

External links
 To World Register of Marine Species

mogadorensis
Gastropods described in 1898